Nayana Madushani Jayaneththi also spelt as Nayana Jayanetthi is a former Sri Lankan field hockey player who represented Sri Lanka at international level. Her husband Nalantha is also a field hockey player who has represented Sri Lanka men's hockey team.

Career 
She pursued her primary education at the St. Anthony's Convent in Kandy and she was persuaded to take up the sport of field hockey by her school teachers. She represented of St. Anthony's Convent school hockey team in school level competitions and also went onto captain the school team. She joined Sri Lanka Navy after completing her secondary education.

She also captained Sri Lankan national team for a brief stint from 2014 to 2015. She also represented Sri Lanka at the 2016 South Asian Games and was part of Sri Lanka hockey team which competed in the inaugural edition of the women's hockey tournament at the South Asian Games. Sri Lanka secured silver medal in the three team tournament after losing the final to hosts India 10–0.

References 

Living people
Sri Lankan female field hockey players
South Asian Games silver medalists for Sri Lanka
South Asian Games medalists in field hockey
Year of birth missing (living people)
Sportspeople from Kandy
People from Central Province, Sri Lanka
Alumni of St. Anthony's College, Kandy
Sri Lanka Navy personnel